Kapar is a federal constituency in Klang District and Petaling District, Selangor, Malaysia, that has been represented in the Dewan Rakyat from 1959 to 1974, from 1986 to present.

The federal constituency was created in the 1958 redistribution and is mandated to return a single member to the Dewan Rakyat under the first past the post voting system.

Demographics

History
It was abolished in 1974 when it was redistributed between Kuala Selangor and Pelabuhan Kelang. It was re-created in 1984 from parts of Kuala Selangor and Pelabuhan Kelang.

Polling districts
According to the federal gazette issued on 31 October 2022, the Kapar constituency is divided into 44 polling districts.

Representation history

State constituency

Current state assembly members

Local governments

Election results

References

Selangor federal constituencies